The 1976–77 FC Bayern Munich season was the club's 12th season in Bundesliga.

Review and events

The club won the 1976 Intercontinental Cup against Cruzeiro, the winner of 1976 Copa Libertadores. In the 1976–77 European Cup the three-time defending champion Bayern was defeated in the Quarterfinals by FC Dynamo Kyiv. Furthermore, Bayern was unsuccessful in domestic competitions and was also defeated in the 1976 European Super Cup by R.S.C. Anderlecht.

Match results

Legend

Bundesliga

DFB-Pokal

European Cup

European Super Cup

Intercontinental Cup

References

FC Bayern Munich seasons
Bayern